Ilebo Airport  is an airport serving the Kasai River port of Ilebo, in Kasaï Province, Democratic Republic of Congo. The runway is within the city.

See also

Transport in the Democratic Republic of the Congo
List of airports in the Democratic Republic of the Congo

References

External links
OpenStreetMap - Ilebo
OurAirports - Ilebo Airport
FallingRain - Ilebo Airport

Airports in Kasaï Province
Ilebo